Chandpur Sadar is an upazila of the Chandpur District in the Division of Chittagong, Bangladesh.

Demographics
According to the 2001 Bangladesh census, Chandpur Sadar had 85,062 households and a population of 436,680, of whom 49.84% were female. It had an average literacy rate of 57.12%.

The old 1991 census states a population of 396,872, of which only 49.28% were more than 18 years of age, 47.75% were female, and 40.1% literate.

Administration
Chandpur Sadar Upazila is divided into Chandpur Municipality and 14 union parishads: Ashikati, Baghadi, Balia, Bishnupur, Chandra, Hanar Char, Ibrahimpur, Kalyanpur, Maishadi, Rajrajeshwar, Rampur, Shakhua, Shah Mahmudpur, and Tarpur Chandi. The union parishads are subdivided into 107 mauzas and 112 villages.

Chandpur Municipality is subdivided into 15 wards and 120 mahallas.

See also
 Upazilas of Bangladesh
 Districts of Bangladesh
 Divisions of Bangladesh
 Demographics of Bangladesh
 Education in Bangladesh

References

Upazilas of Chandpur District